My Street is a party video game on the PlayStation 2 released on March 9, 2003. There are seven minigames and it has very similar gameplay to other party games such as the Mario Party series.

Gameplay
My Street features three modes for the player to choose from, which are story, play, and netplay. The story mode has the player explore the game's neighborhood setting and aiding the children that populate it in order to save the neighborhood and complete the story. The play mode allows players to directly play the minigames against AI. The netplay mode is the game's multiplayer mode, allowing players to play the minigames online through the PlayStation 2's Network Play.

The game has a selection of seven minigames: Volleyball, RC Racing, Marbles, Dodgeball, Chemistry, Chicken Herding, and Lawnmowers. An eighth gamemode, Corn Field Maze, was announced at the game's reveal in E3 2002 but was cut before release. The game modes are accessible by visiting the different children that populate the game's neighborhood setting. The story mode requires the player to unlock the game modes in a specific order by recovering items for those characters.

The player character can either be selected from preset characters or customized through selecting different body parts, hairstyles, and clothing.

Plot
In My Street, the player is put in control of the "new kid," whose role in the game is to beat the bully before August 24—the first day of school.

Reception

My Street received "generally unfavorable reviews" according to the review aggregation website Metacritic.

References

External links

2003 video games
Deck Nine games
Multiplayer and single-player video games
Party video games
PlayStation 2 games
PlayStation 2-only games
Sony Interactive Entertainment games
Video games developed in the United States